The Dr. Arthur W. Allen Home, also known as Allenhurst, is a historic house at 11266 North Trimble Road in Robinson, Illinois. The house was built in 1936 for Dr. Arthur W. and Anna Allen. Arthur W. Allen was a physician and businessman who ran a local medical practice and sanatorium and was vice president of Robinson's Second National Bank. The couple designed their house in the Tudor Revival style, a choice inspired by their trips to Europe in the 1930s. The house's design includes a gabled entrance with a parapet, a gabled bay with a two-story window and multiple buttresses, and a complex roof with several dormers and three chimneys. The Tudor styling continues in the use of wood paneling and ceiling beams in the house's interior.

The house was added to the National Register of Historic Places on December 30, 2020.

References

National Register of Historic Places in Crawford County, Illinois
Houses on the National Register of Historic Places in Illinois
Tudor Revival architecture in Illinois
Houses completed in 1936